Tony Hirst (born 14 June 1945) is a former Australian rules footballer who played with Fitzroy and Melbourne in the Victorian Football League (VFL).

Football
On 6 July 1963, playing on the half-forward flank, and kicking one goal, he was a member of the young and inexperienced Fitzroy team that comprehensively and unexpectedly defeated Geelong, 9.13 (67) to 3.13 (31) in the 1963 Miracle Match.

See also
 1963 Miracle Match

Notes

References

External links 		
 	
 
 Tony Hirst, at Demonwiki.
		
		
1945 births
Living people
Australian rules footballers from Victoria (Australia)		
Fitzroy Football Club players		
Melbourne Football Club players